Collateral ligament of knee may refer to:
 Medial collateral ligament
 Fibular collateral ligament